Cyprian Lansiquot is a Saint Lucian lawyer and politician. He was a Labour Party member of the House of Assembly of Saint Lucia from 1997 to 2006 and served as a parliamentary secretary.

Private career
Lansiquot has a diploma and a post-graduate diploma in agriculture from the University of the West Indies and has worked as an agricultural officer. He received a law degree from the University of Wolverhampton in 2004, was called to the Bar of England and Wales in November 2010, and joined the Saint Lucia Bar Association the following month.

Politician

Lansiquot was elected for the Anse-la-Raye/Canaries constituency in the 1997 national elections, in which the Labour Party won a majority government. In May 1997, he was appointed by incoming prime minister Kenny Anthony as parliamentary secretary to the minister of communications, works, transport and public utilities. He held this position for the next five years, having won a second parliamentary mandate in 2001, and later served as parliamentary secretary to the minister of agriculture, forestry, and fisheries from 2002 to 2006.

Lansiquot fended off a high-profile challenge by trade union leader David Demacque for the Anse-la-Raye/Canaries Labour nomination in early 2006. The Labour Party was defeated in that year's general election, and Lansiquot narrowly lost his seat to Keith Mondesir of the United Workers Party.

Electoral record

References

Living people
Members of the House of Assembly of Saint Lucia
Saint Lucia Labour Party politicians
Year of birth missing (living people)